Biskupice  is a village in the administrative district of Gmina Byczyna, within Kluczbork County, Opole Voivodeship, in south-western Poland.

The village has a population of 660.

References

Biskupice